The Shahab-2 (meaning "Meteor-2") is the successor to the Iranian Shahab-1 missile. It is based on the North Korean Hwasong-6 (modified version of the Hwasong-5, itself a modification of the R-17 Elbrus).

On November 2, 2006, Iran fired unarmed missiles to begin 10 days of military simulations. Iranian state television reported "dozens of missiles were fired including Shahab-2 and Shahab-3 missiles. The missiles had ranges from 300 km to up to 2,000 km. ... Iranian experts have made some changes to Shahab-3 missiles installing cluster warheads in them with the capacity to carry 1,400 bombs." These launches come after some United States-led military exercises in the Persian Gulf on October 30, 2006, meant to train for blocking the transport of weapons of mass destruction.

Variants
Shahab is the name of a class of Iranian missiles, service time of 1988–present, which comes in six variants: Shahab-1, Shahab-2, Shahab-3, Shahab-4, Shahab-5, Shahab-6.

See also
 Qiam 1
 Military of Iran
 Iran's missile forces
 Iranian military industry
 Equipment of the Iranian Army

References

External links
 CSIS Missile Threat - Shahab-2 
 Shahab-3 / Zelzal-3 (www.fas.org)
 Shahab-2 (www.fas.org)
 A Preemptive Attack on Iran's Nuclear Facilities: Possible Consequences (cns.miis.edu)

Short-range ballistic missiles of Iran
Medium-range ballistic missiles of Iran
Tactical ballistic missiles of Iran
Ballistic missiles of Iran
Theatre ballistic missiles
Military equipment introduced in the 1990s